Seven ships of the French Navy have borne the name Andromaque in honour of Andromache, wife of Hector, daughter of Eetion, and sister to Podes.

Ships 
 Andromaque (1778), a 40-gun Nymphe-class frigate.
 Andromaque (1797), a galley, captured from the Venetians.
 Andromaque (1811), a 44-gun frigate.
 Andromaque (1841), a 56-gun frigate.
  (1915), an  launched in 1915 and struck in 1926.
 Andromaque (1939, Q203), an Aurore-class submarine. Never finished
 Andromaque (1939), an auxiliary patrol boats, formerly the tug Fourmi I.

See also

Notes and references

Notes

References

Bibliography 
 
 

French Navy ship names